Unter dem Rauschen deiner Wimpern is an East German film. It was released in 1951.

External links
 

1951 films
East German films
1950s German-language films
1950s German films